William C. Mentzer (May 27, 1907 – December 23, 1971) was an aeronautical engineer noted for his contributions to the airline industry, dealing particularly with aircraft maintenance and economics. He was born on May 27, 1907 in Knoxville, Iowa. After graduating from MIT in 1934, he worked for United Airlines as an engineer. During the course of his career, he was involved in the development of over 50 aircraft and was eventually promoted to a senior management level. He was elected a fellow of the American Institute of Aeronautics and Astronautics and a member of the National Academy of Engineering. He died on December 23, 1971 in Palo Alto, California. He was posthumously awarded the Daniel Guggenheim Medal in 1972.

References

American aerospace engineers
Fellows of the American Institute of Aeronautics and Astronautics
Massachusetts Institute of Technology alumni
1907 births
1971 deaths
20th-century American engineers